The Kia Stonic is a subcompact crossover SUV (B-segment) manufactured by Kia Motors. Its name is derived from the words "stylish" and "iconic". The Stonic debuted in Frankfurt on 20 June 2017 and in South Korea on 13 July 2017, and was released in the fourth quarter of 2017. It is marketed as the Kia KX1 in China.

Overview
The Kia Stonic made its debut at the 2017 International Motor Show Germany. It is the smallest in Kia's SUV lineup, below the Niro, Sportage, and Sorento. The Stonic shares its platform and interior with the fourth generation Kia Rio.

The Stonic is offered with a choice of four engines: a turbocharged 1.0-litre three-cylinder engine, a 1.2-litre four-cylinder engine, a 1.4-litre four-cylinder engine, and a 1.6-litre CRDi four-cylinder diesel engine.

The Stonic was discontinued in South Korea in September 2020 due to sluggish sales. It has been assembled and sold in Pakistan since November 2021.

Kia KX1
The Kia KX1 is the variant built by the Dongfeng Yueda Kia joint venture for the Chinese market. Despite the high resemblance between the KX1 and the Stonic, the KX1 was slightly restyled for the Chinese market, featuring a modified hood, redesigned bumpers, improved DRL, and a circular fuel tank cap. In addition, the KX1 uses a completely different dashboard design. Compared to the international model, the Chinese-made version is marginally shorter, with a full body length of 4,100 mm instead of 4,140 mm, and round fog lamps instead of boomerang-shaped LED lights. It lacks AEB, blind zone monitoring and cruise control compared to the Korean-made version. 

The KX1 is powered by a single 1.4-litre petrol engine producing 100 hp. The transmission is either 6-speed manual transmission, or a six-speed automatic transmission. Additionally, the top of the trim KX1 receives advanced multimedia, climate control, video surveillance cameras and a sports aerodynamic body kit.

The Chinese-made KX1 has been exported to the Philippines under the Stonic nameplate since October 2020. In July 2021, Kia Philippines gifted female weightlifter Hidilyn Diaz a Stonic as a reward for winning the gold medal at the 2020 Summer Olympics.

Safety 
Euro NCAP
Euro NCAP test results for a LHD, 5-door hatchback variant with standard equipment on a 2017 registration:

Euro NCAP test results for a LHD, 5-door hatchback variant with optional safety pack on a 2017 registration:

Awards
The Stonic won the iF product design award in the "Transportation Design" category  and the Red Dot award in the "Car Design" category in 2018.

References

External links

 (UK)
 (China)

Stonic
Crossover sport utility vehicles
Mini sport utility vehicles
Cars introduced in 2017
Front-wheel-drive vehicles
Euro NCAP small family cars
2020s cars